Tsipouro is an un-aged brandy from Greece and in particular Thessaly, Epirus, Macedonia, and the island of Crete (where Cretans call it tsikoudia). Tsipouro is a strong distilled spirit containing 40–45% alcohol by volume and is produced from either the pomace (the residue of the wine press) or from the wine after the grapes and juice have been separated. It comes in two types, pure and anise-flavoured, and is usually not aged in barrels, although barrel aged versions do exist.

History 

According to tradition, the first production of tsipouro was the work of Greek Orthodox monks in  the 14th century on Mount Athos in Macedonia, Greece.

Method of production 

Ripe dark grapes are passed through crusher/destemmers. The mass is left to settle for a few days, just enough to get fermentation started. Formerly, wine would be collected, and only the solid residue would be used for tsipouro in an attempt to get the most out of the plant. Today some producers use the whole of the pulp, without taking out the must for wine production. This results to a superior product, called “apostagma”, sold at approximately twice the price of tsipouro.

In the next stage, the mass is fed into distillation units, where temperature and pressure are closely monitored. The first and last distinct batches (the 'head' and the 'tail') are discarded. Only the intermediate batch (known as the 'heart') is kept to make tsipouro. This process is repeated to obtain doubly distilled tsipouro, which might be superior.

Finally, the distillate is left to settle and mature in stainless steel tanks. It can also be aged in wooden barrels to give 'aged tsipouro', a relatively new beverage that can be compared to whiskey.

Serving 

Depending on the time of year, tsipouro is used either as refreshment or as a hot beverage, and depending on the time of day, it replaces the drinking of coffee or wine. Tsipouro and tsikoudia, like all alcoholic beverages in Greece, are generally consumed at social gatherings.

According to Greek manufacturers, the best way to enjoy tsipouro is straight from the fridge. Some people prefer to either dilute with water or add ice.

Tsipouro is usually served in shot glasses with meze (a small side dish) such as nuts, dried fruit, raisins, cheese, olives, seafood, meat, halva, or paximadi (rusk).

In 2006, Greece filed a request for tsipouro to be recognized as a PDO (Protected Designation of Origin) product, which was granted later that year.

Relation to ouzo 

Anise-flavoured tsipouro is also available, produced especially in Macedonia and Thessaly. Anise-flavoured tsipouro and ouzo have almost identical taste but vary enormously in their method of production. The alcohol used to produce ouzo is 96% ABV rectified spirit (ethyl alcohol of agricultural origin) and therefore does not retain the flavours of the primary distilled products, whereas the lower degree of distillation of tsipouro allows it to retain the aroma of the pomace.

See also

 Tsikoudia (Crete) 
 Komovica (North Macedonia/Serbia) 
 Rakiya (Bulgaria)
 Raki (Turkey)
 Arak (Lebanon)
 Grappa (Italy)
 Orujo (Spain)
 Zivania (Cyprus)

References

External links 
 CHRIS Distillery Est. 1895 with production of traditional Greek Tsipouro like Tsipouro the Simple and Stathopoulos Tsipouro

Anise liqueurs and spirits
Pomace brandies
Greek distilled drinks
Byzantine cuisine
Greek Macedonian cuisine
Greek inventions
Greek products with protected designation of origin